David Richards is an American theater critic and novelist.

Richards spent over thirty years as a theater critic for The Washington Post, The Washington Star and The New York Times. His articles have appeared in numerous publications in the United States. He is the author of Played Out: The Jean Seberg Story, a biography of the controversial American actress Jean Seberg who vaulted to fame in France before committing suicide in 1979.

With American theater director Leonard Foglia, Richards co-authored the 1997 suspense novel 1 Ragged Ridge Road. In 2011 With Leonard Foglia, Richards co-authored the 2011 suspense novel trilogy The Sudarium Trilogy.

References

External links 
 The Sudarium Trilogy

Year of birth missing (living people)
Living people
20th-century American novelists
21st-century American novelists
American male novelists
American theater critics
Critics employed by The New York Times
20th-century American male writers
21st-century American male writers
20th-century American non-fiction writers
21st-century American non-fiction writers
American male non-fiction writers